Sacred Love is an album by Sting

Sacred Love may also refer to:
Sacred Love, choral composition by Georgy Sviridov
Sacred Love, album by the Latvian Radio Choir
"Sacred Love" single by The Breakaways  Mike Leander  1968
"Sacred Love" song by Bad Brains appearing on the albums I Against I and Live
"Sacred Love" Silencer (Nels Cline Trio album)